Xylophanes aglaor is a moth of the family Sphingidae first described by Jean Baptiste Boisduval in 1875.

Distribution 
It is found from Brazil west to Bolivia.

Description 
It is similar in appearance to several other members of the genus Xylophanes, but a number of differences distinguish it from Xylophanes libya, to which it most closely compares, particularly in its darker coloring and pattern, with its clearer contrasts. Black scales are scattered over the wings, which are otherwise striated with five postmedial lines.

Biology 
The larvae probably feed on Psychotria panamensis, Psychotria nervosa and Pavonia guanacastensis.

References

aglaor
Moths described in 1875